Statsminister is a Danish, Norwegian and Swedish word meaning "prime minister" (literally "minister of state"). It is used as an official title for the following heads of government:
Prime Minister of Denmark
Prime Minister of Finland
Prime Minister of Norway
Prime Minister of Sweden